The South Wisconsin District is one of the 35 districts of the Lutheran Church–Missouri Synod (LCMS), and covers the southern third of the state of Wisconsin. The northern two-thirds are in the North Wisconsin District; there are also two Wisconsin congregations in the Minnesota North District. In addition, twelve congregations in the South Wisconsin District's area are in the non-geographic English District, and one in the SELC District. The South Wisconsin District includes approximately 213 congregations and missions, subdivided into 27 circuits, as well as 37 preschools, 58 elementary schools and 6 high schools. Baptized membership in district congregations is approximately 116,600.

The South Wisconsin District was formed in 1916 when the Wisconsin District was divided. District offices are located in Milwaukee, Wisconsin. Delegates from each congregation meet in convention every three years to elect the district president, vice presidents, circuit counselors, a board of directors, and other officers.  The Rev. John Wille became the district president in September 2006.

Concordia University Wisconsin in Mequon, part of the LCMS' Concordia University System, is located within the district. Camp LuWiSoMo in Wild Rose, Wisconsin is owned and operated by the South Wisconsin District.

Presidents  

Rev. Edward Albrecht, 1916–21 (Pastor, Nazareth/Milwaukee)
Rev. Henry John Andrew Grueber, 1921–32 (Pastor, Trinity/Milwaukee)
Rev. John Frederick Boerger, 1932–36 (Pastor, St. John/Racine)
Rev. Fred A. Schwertfeger, 1936–48 (Pastor, St. Stephen/Horicon)
Rev. Arthur H. Oswald, 1948–53 (Pastor, St. Martini/Milwaukee)
Rev. Herbert W. Baxmann, 1953–70 (Pastor, St. John/Plymouth; became district's first full-time president in 1963)
Rev. Karl L. Barth, 1970–82 (Pastor, St. Paul/West Allis)
Rev. Harvey Krueger, 1982-1988 (Pastor, Trinity/Sheboygan)
Rev. Edwin S. Suelflow, 1988-94 (Pastor, Walther Memorial/Milwaukee)
Rev. Ronald E. Meyer, 1994-2006 (Stewardship Executive, South Wisconsin District)
Rev. John C. Wille, 2006-present (Pastor, Good Shepherd/Tomah)

References

External links
South Wisconsin District web site
LCMS: South Wisconsin District
LCMS Congregation Directory

Lutheran Church–Missouri Synod districts
Lutheranism in Wisconsin
Christian organizations established in 1916
1916 establishments in Wisconsin